Masuk may refer to:

Masuk High School, a public high school of Monroe, Connecticut, USA
Poonsak Masuk, Thai footballer known as Nui
Wuttichai Masuk, Thai boxer
Masuk Mia Jony, Bangladeshi footballer
Masuk Formation, Mesozoic geologic formation in the United States